The 1950–51 Scottish Cup was the 66th staging of Scotland's most prestigious football knockout competition. The Cup was won by Celtic who defeated Motherwell in the final.

First round

Replays

Second round

Replays

Third round

Quarter-finals

Replays

Semi-finals

Final

Teams

See also
1950–51 in Scottish football
1950–51 Scottish League Cup

References

External links
 Video highlights from official Pathé News archive

Scottish Cup seasons
Scottish Cup, 1950-51
Scot